is a Japanese politician and the former defense minister of Japan.

Overview 

Eto is a politician of the Liberal Democratic Party, a member of the House of Representatives in the Diet (national legislature). A native of Towada, Aomori, he attended Nihon University as both undergraduate and graduate. He was elected for the first time in 1996 but lost his seat in the re-election four years later. He was re-elected in 2003.

Eto was a short lived Minister of Defense starting from September, when he appointed to his position due to a cabinet reshuffle but ending in December 2014. He declined continuing his post after the 2014 snap election due to being embroiled in a political funding scandal, where he and two other cabinet members was accused by opposition parties of alleged influence peddling, improper donations and/or issues in reporting on political funds. Eto denied the accusations. Analysts say his handling of questions relating to the scandal was considered too weak and was a major reason for Abe to replace him with Gen Nakatani, who is seen as a stronger figure.

Like Abe and most members of the Cabinet, he is affiliated to the openly revisionist organization Nippon Kaigi.

Footnotes

References

External links 
  in Japanese.

|-

1955 births
Japanese defense ministers
Liberal Democratic Party (Japan) politicians
Living people
People from Towada, Aomori
Members of Nippon Kaigi
Members of the House of Representatives (Japan)
Nihon University alumni
Politicians from Aomori Prefecture
21st-century Japanese politicians